Toyota concept vehicles are concept vehicles from Toyota, and may refer to:

Toyota concept vehicles (1935–1969)
Toyota concept vehicles (1970–1979)
Toyota concept vehicles (1980–1989)
Toyota concept vehicles (1990–1999)
Toyota concept vehicles (2000–2009)
Toyota concept vehicles (2010–2019)
Toyota concept vehicles (2020–2029)

See also
 List of Toyota vehicles